Tomo Šestak (20 December 1914 – 1 March 1984) was a Croatian wrestler. He competed in the men's Greco-Roman featherweight at the 1936 Summer Olympics.

References

1914 births
1984 deaths
Croatian male sport wrestlers
Olympic wrestlers of Yugoslavia
Wrestlers at the 1936 Summer Olympics
Sportspeople from Koprivnica